Ypsolopha parenthesella is a moth of the family Ypsolophidae. It is found from Europe to Japan, as well as north-eastern China, Asia Minor and mideast Asia.

The wingspan is 16–20 mm. Adults are on wing from August to September. It is a variable species, especially in wing pattern and colour.

The larvae feed on various trees, including Quercus, Fagus, Fraxinus, Populus, Carpinus (including Carpinus betulus), Crataegus, Malus, Betula and Corylus avellana.

References

Ypsolophidae
Moths of Asia
Moths of Europe
Moths described in 1761
Taxa named by Carl Linnaeus